Yvon Pinard,  (born October 10, 1940) is a judge and former Canadian politician.

Pinard was born the son of Jean-Jacques and Cécile Pinard and was educated at Immaculate Conception School in Drummondville. He then attended the Nicolet Seminary, winning the Lieutenant Governor Onésime Gagnon Medal for Academic Merit, and the Université de Sherbrooke, winning the Lieutenant Governor Paul Comtois Medal for Academic and Social Merit.

He was called to the bar of Quebec in 1964. He founded the Drummond Caisse d'Entraide Economique, involving himself with that organization as well as politics and hockey.

Pinard was first elected to the House of Commons of Canada in the 1974 election. He was the Liberal Party's Deputy Government House Leader from 1977 to 1978. He was Government House Leader and President of the Privy Council in the government of Prime Minister Pierre Trudeau from 1980 until June 1984 when he left politics to accept an appointment to the bench.

He has been a judge on the Federal Court of Canada and the Court Martial Appeal Court of Canada since leaving politics in 1984.

He married Renée Chaput in Richmond, Quebec in 1964 and has two daughters, Hélène and Andrée.

References 
 Canadian Who's Who Entry on Pinard

External links

1940 births
Lawyers in Quebec
Liberal Party of Canada MPs
Members of the King's Privy Council for Canada
Members of the House of Commons of Canada from Quebec
People from Drummondville
Living people
Judges in Quebec
Judges of the Court Martial Appeal Court of Canada
French Quebecers